The 97th Battalion (American Legion), CEF, was an infantry battalion of the Great War Canadian Expeditionary Force. The 97th Battalion was authorized on 22 December 1915 and embarked for Britain in May 1916 but were halted in Aldershot, Nova Scotia when the American government protested the title of American Legion as they were officially a neutral state. The delay caused a number of officers to resign and a number of men deserted when it became clear they would not enter the front lines. Finally the designation ‘American Legion’ was dropped and the unit could proceed overseas. 31 officers and 798 other ranks boaded the RMS Olympic on 19 September 1916. The next month 270 men were absorbed by the Depots of The Royal Canadian Regiment, CEF and the rest, 428 soldiers joined the Princess Patricia's Canadian Light Infantry, also, to provide reinforcements for the Canadian Corps in the field.

Timeline
The 97th Battalion recruited in, and was mobilized at, Toronto, Ontario.

The 97th Battalion was commanded by Lt.-Col. A.B. Clarke and then Lt.-Col. W.L. Jolly from 18 September 1916 to 24 December 1916.

The 97th Battalion was awarded the battle honour THE GREAT WAR 1916.

The 97th Battalion (American Legion), CEF is not perpetuated by any Canadian Army unit.

See also 
211th Battalion (American Legion), CEF
212th Battalion (American Legion), CEF 
237th Battalion (American Legion), CEF

Bibliography
Notes

References

 - Total pages: 188

Sources
Canadian Expeditionary Force 1914–1919 by Col. G.W.L. Nicholson, CD, Queen's Printer, Ottawa, Ontario, 1962

097
Military units and formations of Ontario